Cuentos del Sil (Tales of the Sil) is a Leonese language book written by nine Leonese language writers. It was sponsored by the provincial government of León, and two Leonese language associations: El Fueyu and El Toralín. The authors came from the Sil valley, especially from El Bierzo (León).

The writers, who ranged from teenagers to people who were in their eighties, and from those who had a native competence in Leonese language to those who only had a poor knowledge of it, were these:

 Severiano Álvarez
 Alejandro Díez
 Daniel Fernández
 Eva González
 Roberto González-Quevedo
 Xuasús González
 Félix Llópez
 Adrianu Martín
 Abel Pardo

See also
 Leonese language
 Leonese language writers

External links
 https://archive.today/20120728/http://www.eltoralin.com/cuentosdelsil Cuentos del Sil website (in Leonese language)

References

Leonese language
Leonese-language books